Vestfjarðagöng (regionally also , "Westfjords Tunnel") is the longest tunnel in Iceland, located in Westfjords in northwestern Iceland.

The tunnel has three entrances and the three arms meet at junction in the tunnel. The three arms are known as:
Breiðadalur, 4,150 m (13,615 ft), which gives access to Flateyri and the south-western part of the Westfjords;
Botnsdalur 2,907 m (9,537 ft), which gives access to the village of Suðureyri to the west, a dead end route;
Tungudalur 2,103 m (6,900 ft), which gives access to Ísafjörður and the northern part of the Westfjords.

Only the Tungudalur arm has two lanes throughout. Much of the rest of the tunnel has only one lane with passing places, with traffic light control to avoid collisions.

The tunnel avoids the Breiðadalsheiði road pass, whose summit at 610m was formerly the highest pass in regular use in the Westfjords. It was frequently blocked by snow and prone to avalanches.

References

Road tunnels in Iceland
Tunnels completed in 1996
Buildings and structures in Westfjords